James Millican (February 17, 1911 – November 24, 1955) was an American actor with over 200 film appearances mostly in western movies.

Millican was the son of Fred S. Millican, a circus owner, and Dorothy Millican.

Millican was a close associate of cowboy star "Wild" Bill Elliott, staging a number of personal-appearance rodeos on Elliott's behalf. Millican was sent to Metro-Goldwyn-Mayer's dramatic school directly after graduating from University of Southern California.

Death
Millican died November 24, 1955, aged 45 years, and is buried in Forest Lawn Memorial Park (Glendale), California.

Selected filmography 

 The Sign of the Cross (1932) – Capt. Kevin Driscoll – (1944 Re-Release Prologue) (uncredited)
 Mills of the Gods (1934) – Chauffeur
 Love Me Forever (1935) – Phillip's Friend (uncredited)
 Atlantic Adventure (1935) – Sailor (uncredited)
 Case of the Missing Man (1935) – Pedestrian (uncredited)
 Too Tough to Kill (1935) – Worker (uncredited)
 You May Be Next (1936) – Radio Technician (uncredited)
 Mr. Deeds Goes to Town (1936) – Interne (uncredited)
 Counterfeit (1936) – Roadhouse Patron (uncredited)
 Killer at Large (1936) – Hotel Clerk (uncredited)
 Let's Get Married (1937) – Weatherman (uncredited)
 The Devil Is Driving (1937) – Reporter (uncredited)
 S.O.S. Coast Guard (1937) – Dock Heavy 4 (uncredited)
 She Married an Artist (1937) – Reporter (uncredited)
 Who Killed Gail Preston? (1938) – Hank
 Extortion (1938) – Craig's Brother (uncredited)
 The Main Event (1938) – Policeman (uncredited)
 Highway Patrol (1938) – Oil Worker (uncredited)
 I Am the Law (1938) – Law Student (uncredited)
 You Can't Take It with You (1938) – Policeman (uncredited)
 Flight to Fame (1938) – Pilot (uncredited)
 Spring Madness (1938) – Dartmouth College Student (uncredited)
 The Little Adventuress (1938) – Performer (uncredited)
 The Lone Wolf Spy Hunt (1939) – Cabby (uncredited)
 Flying G-Men (1939, Serial) – Gang Pilot (uncredited)
 Honolulu (1939) – Lifeguard on Ship (uncredited)
 Society Lawyer (1939) – Reporter (uncredited)
 North of the Yukon (1939) – Mountie (uncredited)
 Back Door to Heaven (1939) – Convict in Baseball Game (uncredited)
 Only Angels Have Wings (1939) – Mechanic (uncredited)
 Daughters Courageous (1939) – Boy on Beach (uncredited)
 Coast Guard (1939) – Sailor (uncredited)
 Those High Grey Walls (1939) – Guard (uncredited)
 Scandal Sheet (1939) – Student
 Mr. Smith Goes to Washington (1939) – Senate Reporter (uncredited)
 A Chump at Oxford (1939) – Chauffeur (uncredited)
 His Girl Friday (1940) – Tim (uncredited)
 Convicted Woman (1940) – Cop (uncredited)
 Too Many Husbands (1940) – Nightclub Patron (uncredited)
 The Mortal Storm (1940) – Student (uncredited)
 Golden Gloves (1940) – Bob (uncredited)
 Glamour for Sale (1940) – Client in Nightclub (uncredited)
 So You Won't Talk (1940) – Cop (uncredited)
 Girls Under 21 (1940) – Cop (uncredited)
 Flight Command (1940) – North Island Tower Operator (voice, uncredited)
 Meet John Doe (1941) – Photographer (uncredited)
 I Wanted Wings (1941) – Corporal (uncredited)
 Barnacle Bill (1941) – Sailor (uncredited)
 Washington Melodrama (1941) – Police Detective (uncredited)
 A Woman's Face (1941) – Photographer (uncredited)
 Love Crazy (1941) – Miami Private Investigator (uncredited)
 Down in San Diego (1941) – Sentry (uncredited)
 You'll Never Get Rich (1941) – Prisoner (uncredited)
 International Lady (1941) – Roy (uncredited)
 Among the Living (1941) – Townsman (uncredited)
 The Bugle Sounds (1942) – Recruit Tank Driver (uncredited)
 Nazi Agent (1942) – Operator (uncredited)
 Cadets on Parade (1942) – Lieutenant Thomas (uncredited)
 The Fleet's In (1942) – Sailor (uncredited)
 The Man Who Returned to Life (1942) – Johnny / Charlie (uncredited)
 Joe Smith, American (1942) – Aircraft Plant Foreman (uncredited)
 The Remarkable Andrew (1942) – Onlooker (uncredited)
 Tramp, Tramp, Tramp! (1942) – Draftee (uncredited)
 My Favorite Blonde (1942) – Truck Driver (uncredited)
 Fingers at the Window (1942) – Reporter (uncredited)
 Hello, Annapolis (1942) – Lt. Blake (uncredited)
 The Wife Takes a Flyer (1942) – Gestapo Agent (uncredited)
 Take a Letter, Darling (1942) – Chauffeur (uncredited)
 Wake Island (1942) – Radio Operator (uncredited)
 The Secret Code (1942, Serial) – Reporter Bill [Ch.1] (uncredited)
 The Glass Key (1942) – Politician (uncredited)
 A Man's World (1942) – Parks
 The Forest Rangers (1942) – Cowboy in Hotel Lobby (uncredited)
 I Married a Witch (1942) – Wedding Guest (uncredited)
 Star Spangled Rhythm (1942) – Ramrod – Sailor (uncredited)
 Stand by for Action (1942) – Talker (uncredited)
 Air Force (1943) – Marine with Dog on Wake Island (uncredited)
 Pilot No. 5 (1943) – Lieutenant (uncredited)
 So Proudly We Hail! (1943) – Young Ensign (uncredited)
 Thousands Cheer (1943) – Captain at Eddie's Trial (uncredited)
 Riding High (1943) – Photographer (uncredited)
 Northern Pursuit (1943) – Army Driver (uncredited)
 A Guy Named Joe (1943) – Orderly (uncredited)
 The Story of Dr. Wassell (1944) – Robert Elroy Whaley (uncredited)
 I Love a Soldier (1944) – Georgie (uncredited)
 The National Barn Dance (1944) – Radio Man (uncredited)
 And Now Tomorrow (1944) – Man in Tails (uncredited)
 Practically Yours (1944) – Co-Pilot (uncredited)
 Bring On the Girls (1945) – Guard (uncredited)
 The Affairs of Susan (1945) – Major (uncredited)
 You Came Along (1945) – Lt. Cmdr. George Nelson (uncredited)
 Incendiary Blonde (1945) – Hector – Actor (uncredited)
 Love Letters (1945) – Jim Connings (uncredited)
 Duffy's Tavern (1945) – Assistant Director (uncredited)
 The Lost Weekend (1945) – Nurse (uncredited)
 Tokyo Rose (1946) – Pvt. Al Wilson
 To Each His Own (1946) – Lt. Flyer (uncredited)
 The Blue Dahlia (1946) – Photographer (uncredited)
 The Bride Wore Boots (1946) – Kerwin Haynes (uncredited)
 The Well-Groomed Bride (1946) – Shore Patrolman (uncredited)
 Our Hearts Were Growing Up (1946) – Stage Manager (uncredited)
 The Searching Wind (1946) – Reporter in Madrid (uncredited)
 Rendezvous with Annie (1946) – Capt. Spence
 Two Years Before the Mast (1946) – Young Dandy (uncredited)
 Suddenly, It's Spring (1947) – Military Policeman (uncredited)
 Spoilers of the North (1947) – Bill Garraway
 Stepchild (1947) – Brian Reed
 The Trouble with Women (1947) – Keefe
 The Tender Years (1948) – Kit Barton
 Let's Live Again (1948) – George Blake
 Mr. Reckless (1948) – Pete
 Hazard (1948) – Houseman
 The Return of Wildfire (1948) – Frank Keller
 In This Corner (1948) – Charles 'Tug' Martin
 Rogues' Regiment (1948) – Cobb
 Disaster (1948) – Sam Payne
 Adventures of Gallant Bess (1948) – Bud Millerick
 Command Decision (1948) – Major Garrett Davenport
 Last of the Wild Horses (1948) – Sheriff Steve Harrison
 The Man from Colorado (1948) - Sgt. Jericho Howard
 Rimfire (1949) – Capt. Tom Harvey
 Grand Canyon (1949) – Tex Hartford
 The Gal Who Took the West (1949) – Hawley
 Fighting Man of the Plains (1949) – Cummings
 The Dalton Gang (1949) – Sheriff Jeb
 Everybody's Dancin' (1950) – Papa Steve Berne
 Military Academy with That Tenth Avenue Gang (1950) – Maj. Tony Thomas
 The Gunfighter (1950) – Pete (uncredited)
 Winchester '73 (1950) – Wheeler
 Beyond the Purple Hills (1950) – Rocky Morgan
 Convicted (1950) – Guard in Kitchen (uncredited)
 Devil's Doorway (1950) – Ike Stapleton
 Mister 880 (1950) – Olie Johnson
 The Du Pont Story (1950) – Alfred I. du Pont
 Al Jennings of Oklahoma (1951) – Ed Jennings
 Missing Women (1951) – Hans Soderling
 The Great Missouri Raid (1951) – Sgt. Trowbridge
 Fourteen Hours (1951) – Police Sgt. Boyle
 Rawhide (1951) – Tex Squires
 I Was a Communist for the FBI (1951) – Jim Blandon
 Cavalry Scout (1951) – Martin Gavin
 Warpath (1951) – Gen. George Armstrong Custer
 Scandal Sheet (1952) – Lt. Davis
 Bugles in the Afternoon (1952) – Sgt. Hines
 High Noon (1952) – Deputy Sheriff Herb Baker (uncredited)
 Carson City (1952) – Jim Squires
 Diplomatic Courier (1952) – Sam F. Carew
 The Winning Team (1952) – Bill Killefer
 Springfield Rifle (1952) – Matthew Quint
 Torpedo Alley (1952) – Cmdr. Heywood
 Cavalry Scout (1953) – Luke Bowen
 Cow Country (1953) – Fritz Warner
 Gun Belt (1953) – Wyatt Earp
 The Stranger Wore a Gun (1953) – William Clarke Quantrill (uncredited)
 A Lion Is in the Streets (1953) – Samuel T. Beach
 Crazylegs (1953) – L.A. Ram's Coach
 Jubilee Trail (1954) – Rinardi
 Riding Shotgun (1954) – Dan Marady
 The Long Wait (1954) – Police Capt. Lindsey
 The Outcast (1954) – Cal Prince
 Dawn at Socorro (1954) – Marshal Harry McNair
 The Man from Laramie (1955) – Tom Quigby
 The Big Tip Off (1955) – Det. Lt. George East
 Strategic Air Command (1955) – Maj. Gen. 'Rusty' Castle
 Chief Crazy Horse (1955) – Gen. Crook
 Las Vegas Shakedown (1955) – Wheeler Reid
 I Died a Thousand Times (1955) – Jack Kranmer
 The Vanishing American (1955) – Walker
 Top Gun (1955) – Marshal Bat Davis
 Red Sundown (1956) – Bud Purvis (final film role)

References

External links

 

1911 births
1955 deaths
American male film actors
Male actors from New Jersey
20th-century American male actors